This is a list of IATA-indexed railway stations, which are assigned codes by the IATA, similar to IATA airport codes. Such railway stations are typically used in air-rail alliances or code sharing agreements (commonly known as "Rail Fly") between airlines and rail lines, particularly in Europe. By assigning railway stations an IATA code, passengers on trips involving those stations can be ticketed all the way. Sometimes they can get checked straight through to their final destination, without the bother of having to claim their baggage and check-in again when changing between the rail and air portions of a trip. At other places passengers have to carry their baggage on the train, but anyway need no separate train booking process.

Airports 

Rail lines at airports include:

Austria
 Vienna International Airport

Belgium
 Brussels Airport using Belgian Railways

Denmark
 Copenhagen Airport, air tickets usable for Swedish State Railways (not Danish State Railways).

Finland
 Helsinki Airport, served by the I and P lines of the Helsinki commuter rail network. 

France
 Charles de Gaulle Airport near Roissy, France, with SNCF French Rail and Eurostar.
 Gare de Lyon Saint-Exupéry, the first airport to be served by a high-speed line.

Germany
 Frankfurt International Airport
 Cologne Bonn Airport
 Düsseldorf Airport
 Leipzig/Halle Airport
(AIRail Service with Deutsche Bahn).

Italy

 Milan Malpensa Airport
Netherlands
 Schiphol Airport near Amsterdam, Netherlands. Air France-KLM offers tickets including flights to and from Amsterdam or Paris with corresponding trains and/or buses to Belgium.

Norway
 Oslo Airport, Gardermoen (Flytoget)
 Trondheim Airport, Værnes (Vy)

Sweden
 Stockholm-Arlanda Airport, air tickets usable for Swedish State Railways.

Switzerland
 Geneva Cointrin International Airport railway station (Swiss Federal Railways)
 Zurich International Airport railway station (Swiss Federal Railways)

Turkey
 İzmir Adnan Menderes Airport Rail Station (İZBAN)

United Kingdom
 Birmingham International railway station
 London
Gatwick Airport railway station has connections to London and other points on the National Rail Network
Heathrow Airport stations (Heathrow Express and London Underground Piccadilly line)
Stansted Airport (Stansted Express)
London City Airport (Docklands Light Railway)
 Manchester Airport railway station
 Glasgow Prestwick Airport railway station

United States

 Newark Liberty International Airport in Newark, New Jersey, United States (near New York, New York), with Amtrak.
 Baltimore/Washington International Airport in Baltimore, Maryland, United States, with Amtrak.

Railway station codes
The IATA codes for railway stations normally begin with Q, X or Z, except when the station shares the code with an airport. For some smaller cities the railway station in the city has the same code as the airport outside the city (several kilometers distance). A connection involving transfer between them can appear when searching travel possibilities. A taxi ride, a train, or a bus transfer is usually needed then.

A
 ADB: Adnan Menderes Airport Rail Station, İzmir, Turkey
 AMS: Schiphol Airport railway station on the Weesp–Leiden railway line near Amsterdam, Netherlands; high-speed trains (Thalys and Intercity Direct) to Rotterdam, Brussels and Paris using HSL-Zuid stop at the station as well
 ARN: Stockholm-Arlanda Airport railway station, Sweden (located between terminals 4 and 5)

B

 BHX: Birmingham International railway station, England, United Kingdom ( by rail from the airport)
 BNJ: Bonn Hauptbahnhof, Sankt Augustin, Germany (at Bonn-Hangelar Airport )
 BOO: Bodø Station, Norway (5 km from airport)
 BRS: Bristol, England, United Kingdom ( from airport)
 BRU: Brussels National Airport railway station, Belgium

C
 CBG: Cambridge railway station, England, United Kingdom
 CDG: Aéroport Charles de Gaulle 2 – TGV, Roissy, Paris, France (LGV Interconnexion Est (high-speed line) with TGV/Thalys services)
 CGN: Bahnhof Köln/Bonn Flughafen, Germany (walking distance from the airport). The ICE trains stop here as well.
 CPH: Copenhagen Airport, Kastrup Station, Denmark (underneath airport T3)

D
 DUS: Düsseldorf Flughafen Fernbahnhof, Germany on the Cologne–Duisburg Railway line (SkyTrain people mover).

E
 EEP: Pamplona Railway Station, Pamplona, Spain
 EWR: Newark Liberty International Airport (NJT station), New Jersey, United States ( from the airport via monorail)

F
 FRA: Frankfurt (Main) Flughafen Fernbahnhof in Frankfurt am Main, Germany, on the Cologne-Frankfurt high-speed rail line (walking distance from the airport)
 FVS: Finland Station in Saint Petersburg, Russia

G
 GGZ: Graz Hauptbahnhof, Austria
 GVA: Geneva Airport railway station 

H
 HEC: Helsinki Central railway station, Helsinki, Finland
 HVT: Tikkurila railway station, Helsinki, Finland

I
 IOB: Innsbruck Hauptbahnhof, Austria

J
 JKG: Jönköping railway station, Sweden (11 km from the airport)

K
 KGV: Klagenfurt Hauptbahnhof, Austria
 KLR: Kalmar railway station, Sweden (6 km from the airport)
 KSD: Karlstad railway station, Sweden (17 km from the airport)

L
 LEJ: Leipzig/Halle Airport railway station, Germany (walking distance from the airport)
 LHR: London Heathrow stations: Central, T2,3, T4 tube, T4 rail, T5 (all inside London Heathrow Airport perimeter).
 LPI: Linköping railway station, Sweden (3 km from the airport)
 LPL: Liverpool Lime Street railway station, England, United Kingdom 
 LYS: Gare de Lyon Saint-Exupéry, Lyon, France
 LZS: Linz Hauptbahnhof, Austria

M
 MAN: Manchester Airport railway station
 MHG: Mannheim Hauptbahnhof, Mannheim, Germany

N
 NCL: Newcastle railway station, England, United Kingdom

O
 OSD: Östersund railway station, Sweden (9 km from the airport)
 OSL: Oslo Airport Station, Norway (walking distance from the airport)

P
 PIK: Prestwick Airport railway station, Scotland, United Kingdom
 POK: St. Pölten Hauptbahnhof, Austria

Q
 QDH: Ashford International, Ashford, Kent, England, United Kingdom
 QDU: Düsseldorf Hauptbahnhof, Düsseldorf, Germany
 QFB: Freiburg Hauptbahnhof, Freiburg Germany
 QFV: Bergen railway station, Norway
 QJZ: Gare de Nantes, France
 QKL: Köln Hauptbahnhof, Cologne, Germany
 QLJ: Lucerne railway station, Lucerne, Switzerland
 QLS: Lausanne, Switzerland
 QPP: Berlin Hauptbahnhof, Berlin, Germany
 QQK: King's Cross railway station, London, England, United Kingdom
 QQM: Manchester Piccadilly station, Manchester, England, United Kingdom
 QQN: Birmingham New Street railway station, Birmingham, England, United Kingdom
 QQP: Paddington railway station, London, England, United Kingdom
 QQS: St Pancras railway station, London, England, United Kingdom
 QQU: Euston railway station, London, England, United Kingdom
 QQW: Waterloo International railway station, London, England, United Kingdom
 QQY: York railway station, Yorkshire, England, United Kingdom
 QRH: Rotterdam Centraal railway station, Netherlands
 QRZ: Breda railway station, Netherlands
 QXB: Aix-en-Provence TGV railway station, Aix-en-Provence, France
 QXG: Gare d'Angers-Saint-Laud, Saint-Laud, Angers, France
 QYG: collective code for all German railway stations
 QYX: Uppsala Central Station, Uppsala, Sweden

R
RWA: Warsaw Central station, Warsaw, Poland

S
SIA: Southend Airport railway station at London Southend Airport , England, United Kingdom
 SOO: Söderhamn railway station, Sweden (same code as the old airport which has no scheduled flights anymore)
 STN: Stansted Airport railway station (Stansted Express, underneath airport of same code), England, United Kingdom
 SWS: Swansea railway station, Wales, United Kingdom

T
 THN: Trollhättan railway station, Sweden ( from the airport)
 TRD: Trondheim Airport Station, Norway (walking distance from the airport)
 TTK: Tottenham Hale station, London, England, United Kingdom (no airport)

V
 VIE: Vienna Airport railway station, Austria
 VST: Västerås railway station, Sweden ( from the airport)
 VXO: Växjö railway station, Sweden ( from the airport)

X
 XAT: Gare d'Antibes, Antibes, France
 XAX: Dorval, Montréal, Canada ( from Montréal–Pierre Elliott Trudeau International Airport )
 XBF: Gare de Bellegarde, Bellegarde-sur-Valserine, France
 XBK: Gare de Bourg-en-Bresse, Bourg-en-Bresse, France
 XCG: Gare de Cagnes-sur-Mer, Cagnes-sur-Mer, France
 XDB: Gare de Lille Europe, Lille, France
 XDH: Jasper railway station, Jasper, Alberta, Canada
 XDS: Ottawa Train Station, Ottawa, Ontario, Canada
 XDV: Prince George railway station, Prince George, British Columbia, Canada
 XDW: Prince Rupert railway station, Prince Rupert, British Columbia, Canada
 XDZ: The Pas railway station, The Pas, Manitoba, Canada
 XEA: Pacific Central Station, Vancouver, British Columbia, Canada
 XED: Gare de Marne-la-Vallée – Chessy, France (for Disneyland Paris)
 XEF: Union Station, Winnipeg, Manitoba, Canada
 XEV: Stockholm Central Station, Sweden
 XEW: Flemingsberg railway station (formerly Stockholm Syd Flemingsberg), Sweden
 XFF: Gare de Calais-Fréthun, Calais, France
 XFJ: Eskilstuna Central station, Eskilstuna, Sweden
 XFP: Malmö Central Station, Sweden
 XGB: Gare Montparnasse, Paris, France
 XGC: Lund Central Station, Sweden
 XGH: Flåm Station, Norway
 XGJ: Cobourg railway station, Canada
 XGZ: Bregenz railway station, Austria
 XHJ: Aachen Hauptbahnhof, Aachen, Germany
 XHK: Gare de Valence TGV railway station, Valence, Drôme, France
 XIA: Guelph Central Station, Canada
 XIK: Milano Centrale Railway Station, Milan, Italy
 XIT: Leipzig Hauptbahnhof, Leipzig, Germany
 XIZ: Gare de Champagne-Ardenne TGV, Reims, France
 XJY: Gare de Massy TGV, Massy, France
 XKL: KL Sentral railway station, Kuala Lumpur, Malaysia
 XLM: Saint-Lambert (AMT) station, Montreal, Quebec, Canada
 XLV: Niagara Falls (VIA) station, Niagara Falls, Canada
 XOC: Atocha railway station, Madrid, Spain
 XOP: Poitiers railway station, Poitiers, France
 XPG: Gare du Nord, Paris, France
 XPH: Port Hope railway station, Canada
 XPJ: Gare de Montpellier Saint-Roch, Montpellier, France
 XQE: Ebbsfleet International railway station, Ebbsfleet Valley, England, United Kingdom (Eurostar)
 XQT: Lichfield Trent Valley railway station, England, United Kingdom
 XRG: Rugeley Trent Valley railway station, England, United Kingdom
 XRF: Gare de Marseille Saint-Charles, Marseille, France
 XRJ: Roma Termini railway station, Rome, Italy
 XRK: Paveletsky Rail Terminal, Moscow, Russia
 XSH: Tours Saint-Pierre-des-Corps railway station, Tours, France
 XVQ: Venezia Santa Lucia railway station, Italy
 XWC: Wien Hauptbahnhof, Austria
 XWG: Gare de Strasbourg, France
 XWK: Karlskrona railway station, Sweden
 XWL: Gothenburg Central Station, Sweden
 XWR: Örebro railway station, Sweden
 XWW: Wien Westbahnhof, Austria
 XXL: Lillehammer Station, Norway
 XXZ: Sundsvall railway station, Sweden
 XYB: Borlänge railway station, Sweden
 XYD: Gare de Lyon-Part-Dieu, Lyon, France
 XYG: Praha hlavní nádraží, Prague, Czech Republic
 XYH: Helsingborg railway station, Sweden
 XYJ: Praha-Holešovice, Prague, Czech Republic
 XYL: Gare de Lyon-Perrache railway station, Lyon, France
 XYM: Falkenberg Railway Station, Falkenberg, Sweden
 XZI: Gare de Lorraine TGV, Metz–Nancy area, France
 XZL: Edmonton station, Canada
 XZN: Gare d'Avignon TGV railway station, Avignon, France
 XZO: Oslo Central Station, Norway
 XZT: Trondheim Central Station, Norway
 XZV: Gare de Toulon, Toulon, France

Y
 YBZ: Toronto Union Station, Ontario, Canada (about ) from Billy Bishop Toronto City Airport  by ferry and tunnel)
 YCM: St. Catharines railway station, Ontario, Canada
 YJD: Barcelona Estació de França, Barcelona, Spain
 YJH: San Sebastián railway station, San Sebastián, Spain
 YJL: Santander railway station, Santander, Spain
 YJV: Estación de Nord Valencia, Valencia, Spain
 YMY: Montreal Central Station, Quebec, Canada (about 19 km from Dorval Airport)

Z
 ZAQ: Nürnberg Hauptbahnhof, Nuremberg, Germany
 ZBA: Basel Badischer Bahnhof, Switzerland
 ZBP: Pennsylvania Station, Baltimore, Maryland, United States
 ZBJ: Fredericia Station, Denmark
 ZDH: Basel SBB railway station, Switzerland
 ZDJ: Bern railway station, Switzerland
 ZDU: Dundee railway station, Dundee, Scotland, United Kingdom
 ZEP: Victoria station, London, England, United Kingdom
 ZEU: Göttingen railway station, Göttingen, Germany
 ZFJ: Gare de Rennes, France
 ZFQ: Gare de Bordeaux Saint-Jean, Bordeaux, France
 ZFV: 30th Street Station, Philadelphia, Pennsylvania, United States
 ZGG: Glasgow Central station, Scotland, United Kingdom
 ZGH: Copenhagen Central Station, Denmark
 ZIN: Interlaken Ost railway station, Switzerland
 ZIV: Inverness railway station, Inverness, Scotland, United Kingdom
 ZKD: Leningradsky Rail Terminal, Moscow, Russia
 ZLN: Le Mans railway station, France
 ZLS: Liverpool Street Station, London, England, United Kingdom
 ZLY: Albany–Rensselaer (Amtrak station), Rensselaer, New York, United States
 ZMB: Hamburg Hauptbahnhof, Hamburg, Germany
 ZMI: Napoli Mergellina railway station, Naples, Italy
 ZMS: Firenze Santa Maria Novella railway station, Florence, Italy
 ZMU: München Hauptbahnhof, Munich, Germany
 ZPY: Siegburg/Bonn railway station, Siegburg, Germany
 ZRB: Frankfurt (Main) Hauptbahnhof, Frankfurt, Germany
 ZRH: Zurich International Airport railway station, Zürich, Switzerland (same code as the airport)
 ZRL: Lancaster (Amtrak station), Lancaster, Pennsylvania, United States
 ZRP: Pennsylvania Station, Newark, New Jersey, United States
 ZRT: Hartford Union Station, Hartford, Connecticut, United States
 ZRV: Providence Station, Providence, Rhode Island, United States
 ZRZ: New Carrollton station, New Carrollton, Maryland, United States
 ZSB: Salzburg Hauptbahnhof ÖBB station, Salzburg, Austria
 ZSF: Springfield Union Station, Springfield, Massachusetts, United States
 ZTD: Schenectady station, Schenectady, New York, United States
 ZTE: Louise M. Slaughter Rochester Station, Rochester, New York, United States
 ZTF: Stamford (Metro-North station), Stamford, Connecticut, United States
 ZTJ: Princeton Junction (NJT station), Princeton Junction, New Jersey, United States
 ZTO: South Station, Boston, Massachusetts, United States
 ZTY: Back Bay (MBTA station), Boston, Massachusetts, United States
 ZUA: Utica Union Station, Utica, New York, United States
 ZUG: Harrisburg Transportation Center, Harrisburg, Pennsylvania, United States
 ZVE: Union Station, New Haven, Connecticut, United States
 ZVM: Hannover Messe Bahnhof, Germany
 ZVR: Hannover Hauptbahnhof, Germany
 ZWC: Stavanger station, Stavanger, Norway
 ZWE: Antwerpen-Centraal railway station, Antwerp, Belgium
 ZWI: Wilmington Station, Wilmington, Delaware, United States
 ZWS: Stuttgart Hauptbahnhof, Germany
 ZWU: Union Station, Washington, D.C., United States
 ZXA: Aberdeen railway station, Scotland, United Kingdom
 ZXE: Edinburgh Waverley railway station, Scotland, United Kingdom
 ZXS: Buffalo-Exchange Street Station, Buffalo, New York, United States
 ZYA: Amsterdam Centraal railway station, The Netherlands
 ZYH: Den Haag Centraal railway station, The Netherlands
 ZYN: Nîmes railway station, Nîmes, France
 ZYP: Pennsylvania Station, New York City, New York, United States
 ZYQ: William F. Walsh Regional Transportation Center, Syracuse, New York, United States
 ZYR: Brussels-South railway station [Midi/Zuid], Brussels, Belgium
 ZYZ: Antwerpen-Berchem railway station, Antwerp, Belgium

See also 
 Air-rail alliance
 Airport rail link
 Lists of airports by IATA and ICAO code
 List of railway stations

Geocodes
Lists of railway stations
Lists of abbreviations
Location codes